The Paine Hollow Road South Historic District is a residential historic district roughly along Paine Hollow Road, and Raywid Way in Wellfleet, Massachusetts.  It consists of a cluster of seven 19th-century residences centered just north of Paine Hollow Road's junction with Pleasant Point Road and Baker Road, including one house on Baker Road and one on Rayvid Way.  All seven houses were built by members of the locally prominent Paine family in the mid-19th century, and are predominantly Greek Revival in their styling.

The district was listed on the National Register of Historic Places in 1999.

See also
National Register of Historic Places listings in Barnstable County, Massachusetts

References

Historic districts on the National Register of Historic Places in Massachusetts
Wellfleet, Massachusetts
National Register of Historic Places in Barnstable County, Massachusetts